Eurytrochus strangei is a species of sea snail, a marine gastropod mollusk in the family Trochidae, the top snails.

Description
The shell grows to a length of 10 mm, its diameter 8 mm. The small, rather thin, narrowly umbilicate shell has a globose-conical shape. It is lusterless, olive colored, with scattered white dots, and obliquely radiating brown flames below the sutures, the spiral ribs with minute brown dots. The acute spire is conical,. The sutures are subcanaliculate. The five convex  whorls are encircled by strong spiral ridges, 3 on the upper, 4 on the body whorl, the fourth forming the periphery. The interstices are spirally striate, below the suture radiately lamellose striate. The base contains numerous concentric lirae. A patch around the umbilicus is white, articulated with brown. The aperture is subquadrangular, iridescent and sulcate within. The straight columella is usually green tinged.

The strong keels of the upper surface separate this form from allied species.

Distribution
This marine species is endemic to Australia and occurs off Queensland, New South Wales and Victoria.

References

 Adams, A. 1853. Contributions towards a monograph of the Trochidae, a family of gastropodous Mollusca. Proceedings of the Zoological Society of London 1851(19): 150-192
 Angas, G.F. 1867. A list of species of marine Mollusca found in Port Jackson harbour, New South Wales and on the adjacent coasts, with notes on their habits etc. Proceedings of the Zoological Society of London 1867: 185-233, 912-935
 Fischer, P. 1878. Genres Calcar, Trochus, Xenophora, Tectarius et Risella. pp. 241–336 in Keiner, L.C. (ed.). Spécies general et iconographie des coquilles vivantes. Paris : J.B. Baillière Vol. 11
 Pilsbry, H.A. 1889. Manual of Conchology. Philadelphia : Academy of Natural Sciences Philadelphia Vol. 11 519 pp., pls 1-67
 Whitelegge, T. 1889. List of the Marine and Freshwater Invertebrate Fauna of Port Jackson and the Neighbourhood. Journal and Proceedings of the Royal Society of New South Wales 23: 1-161
 Henn, A.U. & Brazier, J.W. 1894. List of Mollusca found at Green Point, Watson's Bay, Sydney. With a few remarks upon some of the most interesting species and descriptions of new species. Proceedings of the Linnean Society of New South Wales 2 9: 165-182
 Hedley, C. 1903. Scientific results of the trawling expedition of H.M.C.S. "Thetis" off the coast of New South Wales in February and March, 1898. Mollusca. Part II. Scaphopda and Gastropda. Memoirs of the Australian Museum 4(6): 325-402, pls 36-37 
 Preston, H.B. 1909. Description of new trochid shells from north Queensland. Proceedings of the Malacological Society of London 8: 377-378 
 Shirley, J. 1911. Additions to the marine Mollusca of Queensland. Proceedings of the Royal Society of Queensland 23(1): 93-102
 Hedley, C. 1915. Studies on Australian Mollusca. Part XII. Proceedings of the Linnean Society of New South Wales 39: 695-755, pls 77-85
 Hedley, C. 1918. A checklist of the marine fauna of New South Wales. Part 1. Journal and Proceedings of the Royal Society of New South Wales 51: M1-M120
 Allan, J.K. 1950. Australian Shells: with related animals living in the sea, in freshwater and on the land. Melbourne : Georgian House xix, 470 pp., 45 pls, 112 text figs. 
 McMichael, D.F. 1960. Shells of the Australian Sea-Shore. Brisbane : Jacaranda Press pp. 1–127, 287 figs.
 Iredale, T. & McMichael, D.F. 1962. A reference list of the marine Mollusca of New South Wales. Memoirs of the Australian Museum 11: 1-109
 Macpherson, J.H. & Gabriel, C.J. 1962. Marine Molluscs of Victoria. Melbourne : Melbourne University Press & National Museum of Victoria 475 pp
 Phillips, D.A.B., Handreck, C., Bock, P.E., Burn, R., Smith, B.J. & Staples, D.A. (eds) 1984. Coastal Invertebrates of Victoria: an atlas of selected species. Melbourne : Marine Research Group of Victoria & Museum of Victoria 168 pp.
 Wilson, B. 1993. Australian Marine Shells. Prosobranch Gastropods. Kallaroo, Western Australia : Odyssey Publishing Vol. 1 408 pp.

External links
 To World Register of Marine Species
 

strangei
Gastropods of Australia
Gastropods described in 1853